Nikolaos "Nikos" Filippou (alternate spelling: Philippou) (born July 15, 1962, Ioannina, Greece) is a retired  Greek professional basketball player. At a height of 2.02 m (6 ft 7  in.), he played at the power forward position..

Professional career
As a member of the Greek club Aris, Filippou won 8 Greek League championships (1983, 1985, 1986, 1987, 1988, 1989, 1990, 1991) and 5 Greek Cups (1985, 1987, 1988, 1989, 1990). He also played at 3 EuroLeague Final Fours (1988, 1989, 1990) with Aris.

In 1991, he moved to PAOK, and with them he won the Greek League championship in 1992. He also played at the EuroLeague Final Four with PAOK in 1993. He also played with the Greek club Papagou.

National team career
Filippou was also a member of the senior men's Greek national teams that won the gold medal at the 1987 EuroBasket, and the silver medal at 1989 EuroBasket.  He also played with Greece at the 1986 FIBA World Championship.

Post-playing career
As the team manager of the senior men's Greek national team, Filippou won the gold medal at the 2005 EuroBasket, and the silver medal at the 2006 FIBA World Championship. In August 2010, he was appointed to the position of coordinating director of the Peace and Friendship Stadium.

Awards and accomplishments

Pro clubs
9× Greek League Champion: (1983, 1985, 1986, 1987, 1988, 1989, 1990, 1991, 1992)
5× Greek Cup Winner: (1985, 1987, 1988, 1989, 1990)

Greek senior national team
1987 EuroBasket: 
1989 EuroBasket:

References

External links 
FIBA EuroLeague Profile
FIBA Profile
FIBA Profile 2
Hellenic Federation Profile 

1962 births
Living people
1986 FIBA World Championship players
Aris B.C. players
FIBA EuroBasket-winning players
Greek basketball coaches
Greek basketball executives and administrators
Greek Basket League players
Greek men's basketball players
P.A.O.K. BC players
Papagou B.C. players
Power forwards (basketball)
Sportspeople from Ioannina